Tiskre is a subdistrict in the district of Haabersti, Tallinn, the capital of Estonia. It has a population of 1,837. It is the westernmost subdistrict of Tallinn.

References

Subdistricts of Tallinn